Azhikode may refer to:

 Azhikode and Azhikkal, a coastal village in Kannur district, Kerala, India
 Azhikode, Thrissur, a coastal village in Thrissur district, Kerala, India
 Azhikode (State Assembly constituency)
 Azhikode Lighthouse
 Sukumar Azhikode (1926–2012), Indian writer, critic and orator from Kerala